Havnås is a village in the municipality of Trøgstad, Norway. Its population (2005) is 213.

Villages in Østfold